Með suð í eyrum við spilum endalaust (With a Buzz in Our Ears We Play Endlessly) is the fifth full-length studio album by the Icelandic post-rock band Sigur Rós, released on 23 June 2008.

All the lyrics for the album were originally intended to be in English, but in the end the band decided that Icelandic felt more natural to them. Some lyrics were translated back into Icelandic, while some songs got completely new texts. It is the band's first album to feature a track sung in English ("All Alright"). The first track on the album, "Gobbledigook", premiered on Zane Lowe's BBC Radio 1 music show in the UK on 27 May 2008. "Festival" was premiered on Colin Murray's Radio 1 show on 3 June 2008. "Inní mér syngur vitleysingur" was used as the theme tune for Colin Murray's Gold Run, which aired on BBC Radio 5 Live during the run-up to the 2012 Summer Olympics. In December 2008, American webzine Somewhere Cold ranked Með suð í eyrum við spilum endalaust No. 3 on their 2008 Somewhere Cold Awards Hall of Fame.

In general, the music continues Sigur Rós' departure from their generally ethereal and minimalist music, being (as the title and cover suggest) more playful and fanciful than their early work, featuring more traditional guitar melodies, acoustic instrumentation, and folk-oriented compositions following in the vein of their later albums.

The album was available for pre-order from 3 June on the band's official media site, and on 5 June, the band performed "Gobbledigook", "Inní mér syngur vitleysingur", "Festival", "Fljótavík", "Við spilum endalaust" and "All Alright" live in Guadalajara, Mexico. On 8 June, the full album streamed early on the Sigur Rós dót widget. On 19 June, pre-ordered albums began arriving in the mail.

The album's cover features a photograph by Ryan McGinley, entitled "Highway". Originally the album artwork was going to be done by Olafur Eliasson; it would have been the first time the band had passed album artwork to an external artist. In the end they did not like the proposed design and created the cover art themselves using the photograph.

The song "All Alright" played a central role in Neil Jordan's 2009 film Ondine whilst "Festival" featured in the 2010 Danny Boyle film 127 Hours.

Track listing

Personnel
 Jón Þór Birgisson – vocals, guitar
 Kjartan Sveinsson – keyboards
 Georg Hólm – bass guitar
 Orri Páll Dýrason – drums

Strings: Amiina (on tracks 2,3,4,5,8 and 9, recorded in Kjartan Sveinsson's livingroom and Langholtskirkja)
 Hildur Ársælsdóttir
 Edda Rún Ólafsdóttir
 Maria Huld Markan Sigfúsdóttir
 Sólrún Sumarliðadóttir

Brass (on tracks 2, 4 and 11) performed by:
 E. Friðfinnsson
 Helgi Hrafn Jónsson
 I.G. Erlendsson
 K. Håkonarson
 Samúel Jón Samúelsson
 S. Sigurðarson
 S.J. Bernharðsson

Tambourine, claps and other noises by Siggi Frendi, Höddi Gunni, John Best, Sunray and Breeze.

"Ára bátur" recorded live at Abbey Road Studios with the London Sinfonietta and the choristers of the London Oratory School Schola. Directed by D. Bjarnason, engineered by Andy Dudman.

Photography by Ryan McGinley.

Charts

Certifications

References

External links
 UK microsite to promote Með suð í eyrum við spilum endalaust
 Press release on SigurRos.com

2008 albums
Albums produced by Flood (producer)
Sigur Rós albums
EMI Records albums
XL Recordings albums
Icelandic-language albums